Thanin Phanthavong (born 20 May 1998) is a Laotian football player who currently plays as a midfielder for Lao Toyota in the Lao Premier League.

Club career
Phanthavong joined Thai side Bangkok Glass in 2012, and has been loaned to affiliate club, Rangsit FC.

International career
Phanthavong made his senior international debut at the 2016 AFF Championship, replacing Sitthideth Khanthavong in the 42nd minute of a 4–3 win over Brunei.

Career statistics

International

References

External links
 

Living people
1998 births
Laotian footballers
Laos international footballers
Laotian expatriate footballers
Laotian expatriate sportspeople in Thailand
Expatriate footballers in Thailand
Thanin Phanthavong
People from Vientiane
Association football midfielders
Competitors at the 2017 Southeast Asian Games
Southeast Asian Games competitors for Laos